The  was a two-ship class of pre-dreadnought battleships built for the Imperial Japanese Navy (IJN) in the mid-1890s. They were the first battleships in the IJN, and were constructed in the UK as Japan lacked the industrial facilities needed to build them. Their design was based on the battleships being built for the Royal Navy at that time.

The ships participated in the Russo-Japanese War of 1904–1905, including the Battle of Port Arthur in February 1904 and two bombardments of Port Arthur during the following month. Yashima struck a mine off Port Arthur in May and capsized while under tow several hours later. Fuji fought in the Battles of the Yellow Sea and Tsushima and was lightly damaged in the latter action. She was reclassified as a coast defence ship in 1910 and served as a training ship for the rest of her active career. The ship was hulked in 1922 and converted into a barracks ship fitted with classrooms. Fuji was finally broken up for scrap in 1948.

Background
In the late 19th century, the strategy of the Imperial Japanese Navy was based on the radical Jeune Ecole naval philosophy, as promoted by French military advisor and naval architect Emile Bertin. This emphasised cheap torpedo boats and commerce raiding to offset expensive, heavily armoured ships. The acquisition of two German-built s by the Imperial Chinese Beiyang Fleet in 1885 threatened Japan's interests in Korea. A visit by the Chinese warships to Japan in early 1891 forced the Japanese government to acknowledge that the IJN required similarly armed and armoured ships of its own to counter the ironclads; the three lightly armoured s ordered from France would not suffice, despite their powerful guns. The IJN decided to order a pair of the latest battleships from the United Kingdom as Japan lacked the technology and capability to construct its own battleships.

Obtaining funding for the battleships was a struggle for the Japanese government. The initial request was submitted in the budget of Prime Minister Matsukata Masayoshi in 1891, but was deleted by the Diet of Japan due to political infighting. Matsukata submitted the request again and, when again denied, was forced to dissolve his cabinet. His successor, Prime Minister Itō Hirobumi, attempted to pass the funding measure in 1892, but he also failed. This led to an extraordinary personal intervention by Emperor Meiji in a statement dated 10 February 1893, wherein the emperor offered to fund the construction of the two battleships himself, through an annual reduction in the expenses of the Imperial Household, and asked that all government officials likewise agree to a reduction in their salaries by ten percent. The funding measure for the Fuji-class battleships was passed by the Japanese Diet soon after. Completion of the ships was originally scheduled for 1899, but the start of the First Sino-Japanese War shortly before they were laid down in 1894 caused the government to accelerate the schedule by two years.

Design and description

The design of the Fuji class was derived from that of the British s, albeit about  smaller. The Fuji-class ships improved on the Royal Sovereigns in several ways; they were about  faster, they incorporated superior Harvey armour, and their guns, although smaller and lighter, were the same as those of the later  and were protected by armoured hoods (gun turrets). The two ships of the class were almost identical even though they were designed by two different naval architects, Yashima by Philip Watts and Fuji by George C. Mackrow. The primary difference was that Yashima had her deadwood cut away aft and was fitted with a balanced rudder. This made her almost a knot faster than her sister and gave her a smaller turning circle at the cost of a weaker stern that required careful attention when drydocked lest it sag.

They displaced  at normal load. The ships had double bottoms and were subdivided into a total of 181 watertight compartments. The crew numbered about 650 officers and enlisted men. Yashima was fitted as a flagship with accommodation for an admiral and his staff.

Propulsion
A watertight centreline bulkhead separated the two engine rooms as well as the four boiler rooms. The boiler rooms were further separated by a transverse bulkhead. Unlike both the Royal Sovereigns and Majestics, the Fuji class had their funnels on the centreline.

Armament

The main battery of the Fuji class consisted of four hydraulically operated Elswick Ordnance Company 40-calibre Type 41 twelve-inch guns mounted in pear-shaped twin-gun barbettes fore and aft of the superstructure. The barbettes had a firing arc of 240° and the guns had a maximum elevation of +15° and could depress to −5°. These barbettes had armoured hoods, or turrets, to protect the guns. The mountings were virtually identical to those used in the first Majestic-class battleships, which could only hoist ammunition from the below-decks magazines in one position. However, 18 shells were stowed in each turret that allowed a limited amount of firing at any angle before their ammunition supply needed to be replenished.

Secondary armament of the Fuji class consisted of ten 40-calibre Type 41 six-inch quick-firing guns, four on the main deck in casemates and six guns on the upper deck protected by gun shields. Protection from torpedo boat attacks was provided by fourteen  three-pounder Hotchkiss guns and ten 47-millimetre 2.5-pounder Hotchkiss guns. The ships were also equipped with five 18-inch torpedo tubes, one in the bow above water and four submerged tubes, two on each broadside.

In 1901, both ships exchanged 16 of their 47 mm guns for an equal number of QF 12-pounder 12 cwt guns. This raised the number of crewmen to 652 and later to 741.

Armour
The armour scheme of the Fuji-class ships was similar to that used by the Royal Sovereigns except that the Japanese ships used superior Harvey armour of the same thickness instead of compound armour. It reduced to  then  at the ends past the two barbettes; above it was a  strake of armour that ran between the barbettes. They were 14 inches thick outside the upper armour belt and reduced to  behind the upper belt. The armour of the casemates and the barbette hoods had a maximum thickness of 6 inches while the conning tower was protected by 14 inches of armour.

Ships

Service
Both ships had reached Japan by February 1898.
At the start of the Russo-Japanese War in 1904, Fuji and Yashima were assigned to the 1st Division of the 1st Fleet. They participated in the Battle of Port Arthur on 9 February, when Admiral Tōgō Heihachirō led the 1st Fleet in an attack on the Russian ships of the Pacific Squadron anchored just outside Port Arthur. Tōgō chose to attack the Russian coastal defences with his main armament and engage the Russian ships with his secondary guns. Splitting his fire proved to be a poor decision as his  and six-inch guns inflicted very little damage on the Russian vessels, which concentrated all their fire on the Japanese ships. Yashima was not struck during the battle, but Fuji was hit twice, two men being killed and 10 wounded.

When they tried again on 22 March, they were attacked by Russian coastal defence guns that had been transferred there, and also from several Russian ships in Port Arthur using observers overlooking Pigeon Bay. The Japanese ships disengaged after Fuji was hit by a 12-inch shell.

Fuji and Yashima participated in the action of 13 April when Tōgō successfully lured out two battleships of the Pacific Squadron. When the Russians spotted the five battleships of the 1st Division, they turned back for Port Arthur and the battleship  struck a minefield laid by the Japanese the previous night. The ship sank in less than two minutes after one of her magazines exploded. Emboldened by his success, Tōgō resumed long-range bombardment missions, which prompted the Russians to lay more minefields.

On 14 May, the battleships Hatsuse, and Yashima, the protected cruiser Kasagi, and the dispatch boat  put to sea to relieve the Japanese blockading force off Port Arthur. The following morning, the squadron encountered a Russian minefield. Hatsuse struck one mine that disabled her steering and Yashima struck two others when moving to assist Hatsuse. Yashima was towed away from the minefield, but she was still taking on water at an uncontrollable rate and the crew abandoned ship some five hours later. Kasagi took Yashima in tow, but the battleship's list continued to increase and she capsized about three hours later.

During the Battle of the Yellow Sea in August, Fuji was not damaged because the Russian ships concentrated their fire on Tōgō's flagship, the battleship , which was leading the column. In May the following year, during the Battle of Tsushima, Fuji was hit a dozen times, the most serious of which penetrated the hood of the rear barbette, ignited some exposed propellant charges, killed eight men and wounded nine. After the ammunition fire was put out, the left gun in the barbette resumed firing and apparently delivered the coup de grâce that sank the battleship .

On 23 October 1908, Fuji hosted a dinner for the American Ambassador, Thomas J. O'Brien, and the senior officers of the Great White Fleet during its circumnavigation of the world. In 1910, her cylindrical boilers were replaced by Miyabara water-tube boilers and her main armament was replaced by Japanese-built guns. Fuji was reclassified as a first-class coast defence ship the same year, and undertook training duties in various capacities until disarmed in 1922. Her hulk continued to be used as a floating barracks and training centre at Yokosuka until 1945. Fuji was damaged by American carrier aircraft during their 18 July 1945 attack on Yokosuka and capsized after the end of the war. The ship was scrapped in 1948.

Notes

Footnotes

References
 
 
 
 
 
 
 
 
 
 (contact the editor at lars.ahlberg@halmstad.mail.postnet.se for subscription information)

External links

 Global Security site

Battleship classes